Francis Egan (born June 1961) is the chief executive of Cuadrilla Resources. He joined the natural resources industry in the 1980s with Marathon Oil and subsequently worked offshore as a production engineer in the North Sea and then with BHP.

References

Living people
Irish chief executives
1961 births